Gimhae Heo clan is one of the Korean clans. This clan traces their origin to King Suro and his legendary Queen Heo Hwang-ok, who are mentioned in the 13th-century Korean chronicle Samguk Yusa. King Suro was the founder of Gaya confederacy, and his descendant Gim Yu-sin is renowned for unifying the Silla polity. According to a 2015 survey, the population of Gimhae Heo clan is 1,340,688.

The founder of Gimhae Heo clan, a 35th descendant of Queen Heo Hwang-ok and King Suro, was  who served in the court of King Munjong of Goryeo. He was appointed as the Prince of Garak / Gaya.

More than six million present day Koreans, especially from Gimhae Kim, Gimhae Heo clan and Lee (Yi) clans associate their Bon-gwan (geo-biological lineage roots) to Gimhae in South Gyeongsang Province of Korea, and these clans place restrictions on marriage with each other due to the shared ancestors. Today, the Gimhae Gim clan is the largest clan group among them.

The Gimhae Heo clan and Gimhae Gim clan, descended from the two sons of King Suro who used their mother's Queen Heo Hwang-ok's surname, instead of their father's. According to Samguk Yusa, Queen Heo Hwang-ok became the wife of King Suro of Geumgwan Gaya at the age of 16, after having arrived in Gaya confederacy in Korea in the year 48 AD by boat from a distant kingdom called "Ayuta", making her the first queen of Geumgwan Gaya. Her native kingdom is believed to be located in India by some, there is however no mention of her in any pre-modern Indian sources. There is a tomb in Gimhae in Korea, that are believed by some to be of King Suro and Queen Heo, and a memorial of Queen Heo Hwang-ok in Hindu holy city of Ayodhya in India.

References

External links